Frédéric Bruly Bouabré, also known as Cheik Nadro (11 March 1923 – 28 January 2014), was an Ivorian artist.

Life and career
Bouabré was born in Zépréguhé, Ivory Coast, and was among the first Ivorians to be educated by the French colonial government. On 11 March 1948, he received a vision, which directly influenced much of his later works. Bouabré created many of his hundreds of small drawings while working as a clerk in various government offices. These drawings depicted many different subjects, mostly drawn from local folklore; some also described his own visions. All the drawings are part of a larger cycle, titled World Knowledge. Bouabré also created a 448-letter, universal Bété syllabary, which he used to transcribe the oral tradition of his people, the Bétés. His visual language is portrayed on some 1,000 small cards using ballpoint pens and crayons, with symbolic imagery surrounded by text, each carrying a unique divinatory message and comments on life and history.

Many of Bouabré's drawings are in The Contemporary African Art Collection (CAAC) of Meshac Gaba. One of his emblematic drawings is saved in the L'appartement 22 collection on the African continent: "Une divine peinture relevée sur le corps d'une mandarine jaunie", made by Bouabré in 1994 in Abidjan.

Exhibitions
 2022: Frédéric Bruly Bouabré: World Unbound, Museum of Modern Art, New York
 2013: Venice Biennale, Italy
 2012: Inventing the world: the artist as citizen, Biennale Bénin, Cotonou, Bénin
2010–2011: Tate Modern, London, UK
2010: African Stories, Marrakech Art Fair, Marrakech
2007: Frédéric Bruly Bouabré, Ikon Gallery, Birmingham, UK
2007: Why Africa?, Pinacoteca Giovanni e Marella Agnelli, Turin, Italy
2006: 100% Africa, Guggenheim Museum, Bilbao, Spain
2005: Arts of Africa, Grimaldi Forum, Monaco, France
2004–2007: Africa Remix, the touring show started on 24 July 2004 at the Museum Kunst Palast in Düsseldorf (Germany), and travelled to the Hayward Gallery in London, the Centre Georges Pompidou in Paris and the Mori Art Museum in Tokyo.
2003: Frédéric Bruly Bouabré, Musée Champollion, Figeac, France
2002: Documenta 11, Kassel, Germany
2001–2002: The Short Century was an exhibition held in Munich, Berlin, Chicago and New York, organised by a team headed by Nigerian curator Okwui Enwezor
1996: Neue Kunst aus Africa, Haus der Kulturen der Welt, Berlin, Germania
1995: Galerie des Cinq Continents, Musée des arts d’Afrique et d'Océanie, Paris, France
1995: Dialogues de Paix, Palais des Nations, Geneve, Switzerland
1994: Rencontres Africaines, the touring exhibition was shown at the Institut du Monde Arabe in Paris, Cidade do Cabo in Sud Africa, Museum Africa in Johannesburg and in Lisbon, Portugal
1994: World Envisioned, together with Alighiero Boetti, the exhibition hwas shown in DIA Center for the Arts in New York and American Center, Paris, France
1993: Trésor de Voyage, Biennale di Venezia, Venice, Italy
1993: Azur, Fondation Cartier pour l'Art Contemporain in Jouy-en-Josas, France
1993: La Grande Vérité: les Astres Africains, Musée des Beaux-Arts in Nantes, France
1993: Grafolies, Biennale d’Abidjan in Abidjan, Ivory Coast
1992: A Visage Découvert, Fondation Cartier pour l'Art Contemporain in Jouy-en-Josas, France
1992: Oh Cet Echo!, Centre Culturel Suisse, Paris, France
1992: Out of Africa, Saatchi Collection, London
1992: L'Art dans la Cuisine, St. Gallen, Sweden
1992: Resistances, Watari-Um for Contemporary Art, Tokyo, Japan
1991: Africa Hoy/Africa Now, the touring exhibition has shown in Centro de Arte Moderno in Las Palmas de Gran Canaria (Spain), Gröninger Museum in Groningen (Netherlands), Centro de arte Contemporaneo, Mexico City
1989: Magiciens de la Terre, Centre Georges Pompidou and Grande halle de la Villette, Paris, France
1989: Waaah! Far African Art, Courtrai, Belgium
1986: L'Afrique e la Lettre, Centre Culturel Français, Lagos, Nigeria

See also
 Bété alphabet
 Bété languages
 Contemporary African Art
 Culture of Côte d'Ivoire

References

Bio from the National Museum of African Art
 L'appartement 22 Collection in Rabat and exhibition .
Frédéric Bruly Bouabré, On ne compte pas les étoiles (Editions Bordessoules, 1989).

Galleries
Kyo Noir - Contemporary African Art Investment
African Contemporary | Contemporary African Art Gallery
Frédéric Bruly Bouabré: A childlike world of goodness and colour -
Richard Dorment, "Frédéric Bruly Bouabré: A childlike world of goodness and colour" (review), Daily Telegraph, 4 September 2007.

Further reading
Raw Vision, Sarah Lombardi, Issue 69, 2010

1923 births
2014 deaths
20th-century Ivorian male artists
Creators of writing systems
Ivorian government officials
Outsider artists
People from Sassandra-Marahoué District